Marian Sîrbu (born January 29, 1976) is a Romanian sprint canoer who competed in the late 1990s and early 2000s. He won a bronze medal in the K-4 1000 m event at the 1999 ICF Canoe Sprint World Championships in Milan.

Sîrbu also competed in the K-4 1000 m event at the 2000 Summer Olympics in Sydney, but was eliminated in the semifinals.

References

Sports-Reference.com profile

1976 births
Canoeists at the 2000 Summer Olympics
Living people
Olympic canoeists of Romania
Romanian male canoeists
ICF Canoe Sprint World Championships medalists in kayak